Pleurotus opuntiae is a species of Agaricales fungus that grows in the semi-arid climate of central Mexico and in New Zealand, whose mushroom is edible and considered a delicacy in the cuisine of indigenous peoples of Mexico. It is known as hongo de maguey común in Mexican Spanish, seta de chumbera/nopal in Peninsular Spanish, and kjoo'wada in Otomi language. Phylogenetic research has shown that while it belongs to P. djamor-cornucopiae clade, it forms its own intersterility group, but it has also been claimed to be genetically inter-incompatible with P. australis, P. ostreatus (extra-limital), P. pulmonarius and P. purpureo-olivaceus of New Zealand.

Description 
P. opuntiae fruits gregariously in groups of several specimens on dead remains of the plant , from which the binomial name of the fungus derives. They are beige or cream in color. It has either a very short stipe, or often basically nonexistent one.

References 

Edible fungi
Pleurotaceae
Fungal tree pathogens and diseases